Jurgita Štreimikytė (born 14 May 1972 in Alytus, Lithuania) is a Lithuanian former basketball forward who played the WNBA for Indiana Fever and the Euroleague Women with  Kaunas, Valenciennes Olympic and SG Comense among others. She was a member of the Lithuanian national team, winning the 1997 Eurobasket. She retired from international basketball following the 2006 World Championship.

After retiring in 2010, she currently serves as Kaunas' second coach.

On 30 November 2022, she was inducted to the FIBA Hall of Fame in appreciation of her stunning career contributions.

References

1972 births
Living people
Forwards (basketball)
Indiana Fever draft picks
Indiana Fever players
Lithuanian expatriate basketball people in the United States
Lithuanian expatriate sportspeople in France
Lithuanian expatriate sportspeople in Italy
Lithuanian women's basketball players
Sportspeople from Alytus